George Archer (1848–1920) was an American architect. A native of Baltimore, and Maryland and a graduate of Princeton University in Princeton, New Jersey, he designed several churches, banks, and other buildings in the Mid-Atlantic states of the U.S.A.

Works

 Harford National Bank at Bel Air, Maryland, the county seat of Harford County, Maryland, northeast of Baltimore.
 Walters Bath No. 2 on the 900 block of Washington Boulevard, in the southwest area of Baltimore, Maryland in the Pigtown / Washington Village neighborhood.
 Two private homes in Sudbrook Park, Maryland on the west side of suburban Baltimore County.
 Buildings at the College of Notre Dame of Maryland, on North Charles Street, (later renamed the Notre Dame of Maryland University)
 Graham-Hughes House, his 1888 landmark residence on the southwest corner of North Charles and West Madison Streets, facing Washington Place and the famous Washington Monument in the Mount Vernon-Belvedere neighborhood of central Baltimore, Maryland.

References 

 
1848 births
1920 deaths
Architects from Maryland
Princeton University alumni